Time Again is a punk rock band.

Time Again may also refer to:

 Time Again (Claire Voyant album), 2000
 Time Again (David Sanborn album), 2003
 Time Again... Amy Grant Live, an album by Amy Grant

See also

 Christmas Time Again
 Construction Time Again
 Killing Time Again
 "Time Again and World"
 Time and Again (disambiguation)